Sexdrega is a locality situated in Svenljunga Municipality, Västra Götaland County, Sweden with 787 inhabitants in 2010.

Sports
Their local football club is FC Lockryd.

References 

Populated places in Västra Götaland County
Populated places in Svenljunga Municipality